The Grande Sertão Veredas National Park is a national park located on the border between the states of Minas Gerais and Bahia, Brazil.

Location

The park is in the Cerrado biome.
It was created by decree nº 97.658 of 12 April 1989, revised on 21 May 2004.
It is in the municipality of Formoso, Minas Gerais.
Annual rainfall averages .

The park contains forests, savannah, cerrado and dense cerrado.
There are extensive streams (veredas) which can form oxbow lakes or larger rivers.
The terrain contains extensive sandstone plateaus covered in savannah vegetation with lower drainage areas holding the streams.
The park contains much of the upper basin of the Carinhanha River and of the sub-basins of its tributaries such as the Itaguari, Mato Grande, Preto and Canabrava.

Conservation

The park is classed as IUCN protected area category II (national park).
As a national park it has the basic objectives of preserving natural ecosystems of great ecological relevance and scenic beauty, enabling scientific research, environmental education, outdoor recreation and eco-tourism.
Specifically the park aims to preserve the basin of the Carinhanha River, an important tributary of the São Francisco River, to preserve the streams and landscape described in the novel The Devil to Pay in the Backlands (in Portuguese Grande Sertão: Veredas) by João Guimarães Rosa, and also to preserve the flora and endemic fauna of the Cerrado.

Protected species in the park include the maned wolf (Chrysocyon brachyurus), jaguar (Panthera onca), cougar (Puma concolor), ocelot (Leopardus pardalis), colocolo (Leopardus colocolo), Brazilian merganser (Mergus octosetaceus), marsh deer (Blastocerus dichotomus), giant anteater (Myrmecophaga tridactyla), giant armadillo (Priodontes maximus), Brazilian three-banded armadillo (Tolypeutes tricinctus) and Owl's spiny rat (Carterodon sulcidens),.

Notes

Sources

National parks of Brazil
Protected areas established in 1989
Protected areas of Bahia
Protected areas of Minas Gerais
Cerrado